Najdi.si is a Slovenian search engine and web portal created by Interseek. It uses a technology created by Interseek. The technology is written entirely in Java.
 Today najdi.si is owned and managed by the company TSmedia.

See also
 Noviforum

References

External links
Najdi.si website
Interseek ltd., the company that created Najdi.si and InterSeek Technology

Internet search engines
Internet in Slovenia
Slovenian websites
Slovenian brands